Northern Upstart Ltd is a UK independent media production company based in Newcastle upon Tyne, United Kingdom.

It was founded in 2009 by Judith Holder and Mark Murray.  Holder started her career at London Weekend Television producing Clive James and Dame Edna, but has worked for over 30 years in production at both the BBC and ITV. Murray has spent many years in production at BBC and ITV making shows such as After They Were Famous, The 100 Greatest... and Grumpy Old Women.

Northern Upstart produced programmes include Let the Stories Begin (Sky Atlantic HD / Sky1), Mark Knopfler:A Life in Songs (BBC4) and Are You Having a Laugh? TV and Disability (BBC2).

Northern Upstart won a Royal Television Society Award along with Markthreemedia at The North East & The Border Centre's Awards 2010 in the Best Drama or Entertainment category for Are You Having a Laugh? TV and Disability.

References

External links
Official website

Mass media companies of England
Mass media companies established in 2009
Companies based in Newcastle upon Tyne
British companies established in 2009
2009 establishments in England